The Ontario Lacrosse Association (Ontario Lacrosse) is a not-for-profit sport organization and a member association of the Canadian Lacrosse Association, the national governing body for lacrosse in Canada. The Ontario Lacrosse Association is the largest provincial lacrosse governing body within Canada. The mission of the OLA is to govern, improve, foster, and perpetuate the sport of lacrosse in Ontario. It was established in 1897.

One of the oldest team sports in North America, the origins of lacrosse lie with the Native American people who lived in Ontario, Quebec and western New York. The first written rules were established in 1867, and although formal amateur provincial competition began in 1887, the Ontario Lacrosse Association was not established as the provincial governing body of the sport until ten years later. In the 1930s, the birth of box lacrosse (indoor lacrosse) increased the popularity of the sport among both athletes and observers. Although official competition was impacted by the number of participants available during both World War I and World War II, lacrosse teams have maintained activity on an annual basis since the inception of the Ontario Lacrosse Association.

Leadership

Sean O'Callaghan, President

Ian Garrison, VP Officiating

Colleen Grimes, VP Promotion

Reg Hollinshead, VP Junior - Major Lacrosse

George MacDonald, VP Finance

Rick Phillips, VP Coaching

Sonya Crossey - VP Development

Jennifer Price, VP Field Lacrosse

Mary Stica, VP Minor Lacrosse

Marion Ladouceur, Past President

Leagues
Senior
Major Series Lacrosse (MSL) - Senior A
Ontario Series Lacrosse (OSL) - Senior B
Senior Series Lacrosse (SSL) - Senior C
Ontario Women's Box Lacrosse League (OWBLL)
Ontario Senior Men's Field Lacrosse League (OSMFLL)

Junior
Ontario Junior Lacrosse League (OJLL) - Junior A
Ontario Junior B Lacrosse League (OJBLL)
Ontario Junior C Lacrosse League (OJCLL)
Ontario Junior Men's Field Lacrosse League (OJMFLL)

Minor
 Ontario Minor Field Lacrosse League (OMFLL)
 Ontario Women's Field Lacrosse League (OWFL)

Minor Box Lacrosse Clubs

There are 66 minor box lacrosse clubs in the Ontario Lacrosse Association. Minor box clubs are divided into zones for league play and the provincial champion is crowned in 6 divisions every August at the Ontario Lacrosse Festival in Durham Region. 

Zone 1

Sault Ste. Marie Spartans 

Thunder Bay Ice

Zone 4

Barrie Bombers

Huntsville Hawks

Innisfil Wolfpack

Midland Braves

New Tecumseth Renegades

Orillia Kings

Stayner Hitmen

Sudbury Rockhounds

Tri-Town Rock Devils

Shelburne Vets

Zone 5

Akwesasne Storm 

Cornwall Celtics 

Gloucester Griffins 

Kahnawake Mohawks 

Kingston Krossfire 

Nepean Knights 

North Shore Kodiaks 

Quinte Bayhawks 

South Shore Centurions 

Tyendinaga Thunderbirds

Zone 6

Clarington Gaels 

Kawartha Lakes Fury 

Northumberland Nemesis 

Oshawa Blue Knights 

Peterborough Lakers 

Stouffville Thunder 

Toronto Beaches 

Toronto Stars 

Uxbridge Enforcers 

West Durham Lacrosse Club 

Whitby Warriors

Zone 7

London Blue Devils 

Sarnia Pacers 

Strathroy Screaming Eagles 

Wallaceburg Griffins 

Windsor Warlocks

Zone 8

Arthur Aces 

Brantford Warriors 

Cambridge Chiefs 

Centre Wellington Mohawks 

Guelph Regals 

Kitchener Braves 

North Perth Outlaws 

Owen Sound North Stars 

West Grey Rampage 

Wilmot Wild

Zone 9

Burlington Chiefs

Fort Erie Hawks 

Hamilton Bengals 

Lincoln Redcoats 

Niagara Thunderhawks 

Pelham Raiders 

Simcoe Timberwolves 

Six Nations 

St. Catharines Athletics

Zone 10

Brampton Excelsiors 

Caledon Bandits 

Halton Hills Bulldogs 

Milton Mavericks 

Mimico Mountaineers 

Mississauga Badgers 

Newmarket Redbirds 

Oakville Hawks 

Orangeville Northmen

National championships
The champion of four of the OLA's five box leagues compete in national championships:

Senior A - Mann Cup
Senior B - Presidents Cup
Junior A - Minto Cup
Junior B - Founders Cup

External links
 Ontario Lacrosse Association
 OJLL
 MSL
OSMFLL
OJMFLL

 
1897 establishments in Ontario
Lacrosse governing bodies of Canada
Lac
Lacrosse in Ontario
Sports leagues established in 1897